College of Physicians & Surgeons of Mumbai or CPS Mumbai or CPS Bombay, established in 1912, is an autonomous body imparting Postgraduate Medical Education and offers 10 Fellowship, 17 Diploma, and 2 Certificate Courses. It is located in Mumbai near KEM Hospital and it caters to doctors from all over India. The qualifications granted by CPS Mumbai allow the Practitioner to register themselves as specialists in the specialty concerned, upon duly completing the tenure of 2 years Diploma or 3 years Fellowship and passing the exit examination prescribed.

History
In 1912, through its Governor,  the British Government permitted to establish a Postgraduate Medical Institution in accordance with the "Royal College of Surgeons of England." Dr. Rajab Ali Patel agreed to establish such a college by dropping the prefix 'Royal.' Hence the birth of the institution "College of Physicians and Surgeons," now popularly known as CPS. Initially, it was registered under the Bombay Society Act of 1860 in March 1913. Established as a sister institute similar to the Royal College of Surgeons in London, which dates back to the 14th century, CPS functions as an examining body and provides affiliations to different district & private hospitals and medical colleges.
CPS Mumbai has been offering various Fellowship and Diploma courses at the Postgraduate level to meet the shortage of specialist doctors in India. It is the only examining body besides the National Board of Examinations (NBE) to have been recognized by the Ministry of Health and Family Welfare to impart Postgraduate Medical Education and currently has around 1,600 Doctors pursuing specialization under its ambit.

Establishment

On 21 April 1912, a committee meeting  was called to discuss the proposal in forming a college. The proposal was put to the vote and passed unanimously. It was also decided that college should function as a Registered Society. Therefore, steps were taken to register it under Societies Registration Act XXI of 1860, and documents were signed to that effect on 4 March 1913.

Surgeon General H W. Stevenson was unanimously elected as Founder President, while Dr. Temulji B. Nariman and Col. C. H. L. Meyer were elected as Vice-Presents. The college committee converted itself into the first Council of the college. Then the constitution was drafted and passed unanimously.

Administration office
CPS is situated in the prime locality of Mumbai near KEM Hospital, Parel, and its office comprises an area of approximately 80,000 sq. feet in a five-storied building having different departments. The CPS has four lecture halls and four examination halls, which accommodates approximately 500 students.

Fellowship and Diploma
College of Physicians and Surgeons of Mumbai offers 3-year Fellowship and 2-year Diploma courses. Both courses are full-time stipendiary hospital positions allowing the holder an entry onto the specialist register.

Various Fellowship courses offered by CPS (3-year Specialist Training Course)

Various Diploma Courses offered by CPS (2-year Specialist Training Course)

Certificate
Certificate Courses: These are 1-year Certificate Courses designed to be imparted at post MBBS level. They are recognized as specialist medical qualifications by the Gujarat Medical Council. However, no post MBBS certificate course is recognized by Medical Council of India as a specialist qualification.

State Medical Council recognition

All Diploma courses are recognized by

1. 	Maharashtra Medical Council (MMC) vide GR Extraordinary 4-B dated 15 March 2010 through notification no. PGM.1010/CR-18 (Part 2)/ 10/EDU-2 read with  the MMC Act 1965.

2. 	Gujarat Medical Council (GMC) vide GR no. MCG/10/2011/460646/J dated 26 August 2011.

3. Rajasthan Medical Council (RMC)

4. Chhattisgarh Medical Council (CMC)

5. Madhya Pradesh Medical Council (MPMC)

6. Odisha Council of Medical Registration (OCMR)

7. Union Territory of Dadra & Nagar Haveli and Daman & Diu.

Such recognition has sometimes been controversial.

National recognition
MCPS, FCPS (Medicine), FCPS (Surgery), FCPS (Midwifery & Gynaecology), FCPS (Ophthalmology), FCPS (Dermatology & Venereology), DGO, DCH and DPB qualifications granted by College of Physicians and Surgeons of Mumbai were recognized since its Inception in 1913. However, in December 2009, the Union Ministry of Health and Family Welfare derecognized qualifications granted by the College of Physicians and Surgeons owing to a lack of infrastructure and faculty required to run the courses.

Ministry of Health and Family Welfare, New Delhi (MoHFW) in the Notification dated October 17, 2017, recognized all the PG diploma courses (DGO, DCH, DPB, D.ORTHO, DMRE, DDV, DTMH, DOMS, DA, TDD, DORL, DGM, DGS, DFP, DPM, DTM, DFP, DEME along with Super-speciality Diploma Courses) offered by the College of Physicians & Surgeons of Mumbai after an extensive review of the courses and based on recommendations of PG Medical Education Committee spearheaded by Dr Devi Shetty.
The Notification - 
S.O. 3402(E).—In exercise of the power conferred by sub-section (2) of Section 11 of the Indian Medical Council Act, 1956 (102 of 1956), the Central Government, after consulting the Medical Council of India, hereby makes the further amendments in the First Schedule of the Act, namely and inserted all Broad Specialty Diploma Courses (two years courses at the Post MBBS level) offered by the College Of Physicians & Surgeons of Mumbai, with the following note.

Note : 
(i) All the admissions should be through NEET PG and centralized counselling and as per Government policy from time to time.
(ii) The CPS qualifications shall not be treated as a recognized medical qualification for the purpose of teaching. 
(iii) Further, any postgraduate degree course to be run by the CPS shall be with the prior approval of this Ministry subject to fulfillment of stipulations prescribed on the lines of Minimum Standard Requirement Regulations of MCI.

Four months after the Union Ministry of Health and Family Welfare had recognized all PG diplomas granted by the College of Physicians and Surgeons, the same ministry derecognized all of them except DGO, DCH and DPB, by a notification published on January 22, 2018. They added 6 Fellowship courses to the list of courses recognized by the Medical Council of India. Therefore, currently only three PG Diplomas and six Fellowships granted by CPS are now recognized by the Medical Council of India (MCI)/National Medical Commission (NMC) . 
However, this notification didn't affect the recognition status of candidates who enrolled themselves in PG Diploma Courses offered by CPS Mumbai between October 2017 and February 2018. All the Broad Specialty PG Diploma holders (D.ORTHO, DMRE, DDV, DOMS, DORL, DPM, DTMH, DTM, DA, TDD, DTM, DFP, DPH, DGM, DGS) of this interim period continue to be recognized as specialists.

References

Medical colleges in Maharashtra
Universities and colleges in Mumbai
Educational institutions established in 1913
1913 establishments in India
Affiliates of Maharashtra University of Health Sciences